Leroy Reginald Johnson (July 28, 1928 –  October 24, 2019) was an American politician who served in the Georgia State Senate from 1963 to 1975 after winning a seat in the 1962 Georgia General Assembly election. He was the first black state senator to be elected to the legislature in more than fifty years, since William H. Rogers in 1907, and the first to be elected to the Senate since 1874. He served District 38 in Fulton County and Atlanta, a predominantly black senate district created after the elimination of the county-unit system that same year.  Before his term as senator, Johnson was an attorney where he played a role in Atlanta's civil rights movement of the 1960s. He was later a candidate in the 1973 Atlanta mayoral election but received few votes, despite being familiar to voters and having an endorsement from The Atlanta Constitution. The position went instead to Maynard Jackson who in turn became Atlanta's first African American mayor.

In 2017, the State Bar of Georgia awarded its highest recognition, The Lifetime Achievement Award, to Johnson during a special ceremony held in February. Johnson died on October 24, 2019 at the age of 91.

References

Georgia (U.S. state) state senators
African-American state legislators in Georgia (U.S. state)
1928 births
2019 deaths
Politicians from Atlanta
Morehouse College alumni
Clark Atlanta University alumni
Georgia (U.S. state) lawyers
African-American lawyers
20th-century American lawyers
20th-century African-American people
21st-century African-American people